Jit Jung Kunwar Rana was the Commander-In-Chief of the Nepalese Army from 14 October 1884 to 1885.

Biography 

He was the second son of Jung Bahadur Rana, the first Prime Minister of Nepal from the Rana dynasty.

On 14 October 1884, following the death of his uncle Dhir Shumsher Rana, Jit was promoted to be the Commander-In-Chief of the Nepalese Army.

On 24 February 1855, Rana married the second daughter of King Prithvi Bir Bikram Shah. 

He was removed from power following the 1885 Nepal coup d'état where his brother Jagat Jang Rana and his uncle Ranodip Singh Kunwar were killed.

Rana was succeeded by Khadga Shumsher Jung Bahadur Rana. In the 1850s, he built Ranibas Palace (later converted into a Hindu temple) at Simraungadh in memory of his father, Jung Bahadur Rana.

References 

19th-century Nepalese nobility
Children of prime ministers of Nepal
Nepalese generals
Rana dynasty

External links